Kevin Godfrey may refer to:

 Kevin Godfrey (footballer) (born 1960), English football winger
 Epic Soundtracks (1959–1997), British musician